

Mal

References

Lists of words